Corbin Dean Bernsen (born September 7, 1954) is an American actor and film director. He appeared as divorce attorney Arnold Becker on the NBC drama series L.A. Law, as Dr. Alan Feinstone in The Dentist, as retired police detective Henry Spencer on the USA Network comedy-drama series Psych, and as Roger Dorn in the films Major League, Major League II, and Major League: Back to the Minors. He also appeared regularly on The Resident, General Hospital, and Cuts, and has had intermittent appearances on The Young and the Restless.

Early life 
Bernsen was born in the North Hollywood neighbourhood of Los Angeles, California, the eldest son of Harry Bernsen Jr., a Hollywood producer, and veteran soap actress Jeanne Cooper, who appeared on The Young and the Restless. He graduated from Beverly Hills High School in 1972. Bernsen is also a "double Bruin," having received both a BA in Theatre Arts in 1977 and an MFA in Playwriting in 1979 from the University of California, Los Angeles (UCLA).

Career

Acting 
After a two-year appearance on the soap opera Ryan's Hope, Bernsen was cast as lawyer Arnold Becker on the Steven Bochco television series L.A. Law in 1986. The series became a hit, and the role earned him Emmy and Golden Globe nominations, appearances on magazine covers, and guest-starring roles on Seinfeld and The Larry Sanders Show. He remained on L.A. Law for the entire run of the show, until it ended in 1994.

Bernsen appeared with the British actor Bruce Payne in the films Kounterfeit and Aurora: Operation Intercept. He starred as the title character, Dr. Alan Feinstone, in the horror film The Dentist and its sequel. Bernsen was also cast as a prima donna third baseman, Roger Dorn, in the sports comedy Major League and appeared in both of the film's sequels. Bernsen portrayed John Durant on General Hospital from September 2004 until the character was murdered in May 2006.

Bernsen played Jack Sherwood on Cuts, appeared twice on Celebrity Mole, and played a lawyer on Boston Legal. He appeared as Q2 on Star Trek: The Next Generation.  He also had a recurring role as Captain Owen Sebring on the military drama JAG and played a Republican senator on two episodes of The West Wing. He directed, produced, and appeared in the horror film Dead Air. Bernsen also co-starred in USA's Psych, playing the role of Henry Spencer, the father of the main character, Shawn Spencer (James Roday). In the film Rust, Bernsen plays a former minister who returns to his hometown.

Bernsen appeared in 25 Hill, a film he produced, directed and wrote, which is centered on the All-American Soap Box Derby, and is planning a baseball movie about zombies, called Three Strikes, You're Dead.

He also appeared as a guest star in Switched at Birth, the ABC Family television series, in season 1, episode 22 (2012), "Venus, Cupid, Folly, and Time." Bernsen currently appears as Kyle Nevin on the television series The Resident.

Producing 
Bernsen was president and co-owner of Public Media Works, a new media company that develops entertainment for targeted fan bases. He directed and starred in Carpool Guy, the company's first film; it was targeted at soap opera fans and released on DVD in 2005.

Bernsen then went on to form Team Cherokee Productions. According to the book One Red Paperclip, in June 2006, Bernsen traded a role in the film Donna on Demand to Kyle MacDonald for a snow globe of the band KISS. It was this role that MacDonald eventually traded for a two-story farmhouse.

In recent years, Bernsen focused on stories that explore aspects of faith in today's world and how that can contribute to, but also tends to divide our common humanity. His first such film was Rust, released in 2010 by Sony Pictures. Bernsen, along with producing partner Chris Aronoff, formed Home Theater Films, an independent production company that develops, produces, and markets films and television shows. 25 Hill, the company's first title, was released in July 2012. This was followed by 3 Day Test (2012), Beyond the Heavens (2013), and Life with Dog (2017). Their upcoming film Mary 4 Mayor is due out in the fall of 2020.

Writing 
In October 2015, the Pelican Book Group released Bernsen's debut novel. The book, Rust: the Novel, is an adaptation of Bernsen's 2010 feature film, Rust, in which he played the main character and served as writer and director. Bernsen and his wife, Amanda Pays, have co-authored two books, Change Houses, Not Spouses and Open House: Reinventing Space for Simple Living, a coffee table book featuring remodeling and design ideas they have learned from remodeling their own homes.

Personal life 
Bernsen was married to Brenda Cooper from 1983 to 1987. Bernsen has been married to British actress Amanda Pays since 1988. They have four sons: Oliver, Angus, Henry and Finley. Pays and Bernsen moved to the Hudson Valley in upstate New York in 2019 where he now focuses on film and television projects that can be shot locally.

Bernsen has one of the largest snow globe collections in the world, with 9,000 globes.

Filmography

Film

Television

References

External links 

1954 births
Male actors from Los Angeles
American male film actors
American game show hosts
American male soap opera actors
American male television actors
Living people
Participants in American reality television series
UCLA Film School alumni
People from North Hollywood, Los Angeles